Shunyo Park or Shunyo Garden is a  Zen garden in the Osho Ashram at Koregaon Park, Pune, India.

Parks in Pune
Geography of Pune